City Road is a street in Islington, London.

City Road may also refer to:

Roads

 City Road, Cardiff, Wales
 City Road, Sydney, a road located in Sydney, New South Wales, Australia

Other transport

 City Road Basin, part of the Regent's Canal in London, England
 City Road Goods Branch a goods only branch serving the Lister Hills area of Bradford, West Yorkshire, England
 City Road Lock a lock on the Regent's Canal, in the London Borough of Islington, England
 City Road tube station a former London Underground station

Places

 City Road Baptist Church, a Baptist church on Upper York Street, Bristol, England
 City Road Cemetery, a cemetery in the City of Sheffield, England
 City Road Chapel a Methodist church on City Road, London

See also

 Road City